The following lists events that happened during 1999 in Laos.

Incumbents
President: Khamtai Siphandon
Vice President: Oudom Khattigna (until 9 December)
Prime Minister: Sisavath Keobounphanh

Events

October
26 October - Five Lao student leaders are arrested for attempting to organize a peaceful protest demanding democratic reforms.

Deaths
9 December - Oudom Khattigna, Vice President of Laos (b. 1930)

References

 
Years of the 20th century in Laos
Laos
1990s in Laos
Laos